Physaria fendleri is a species of flowering plant in the family Brassicaceae known by several common names, including Fendler's bladderpod, popweed, and lesquerella.

Distribution
The plant is native to the Southwestern United States and northern Mexico.

It is also cultivated in these regions, as it does best in their climates and in local calcareous soils. It requires less irrigation than many other crops, due to its adaptation to life in an arid region.

Description
Physaria fendleri is a perennial plant in natural habitats. It is cultivated as a winter annual.

It produces hairless capsules called siliques which contain 6 to 25 seeds each.

Uses
The species is best known as the richest source of bladderpod oil. Most Physaria species contain the hydroxy acid lesquerolic acid in their oil with a seed oil content of ~24%. This oil is useful as a replacement for castor oil in some applications due to its ability to form estolides. If the plant becomes more widely cultivated and breeding and refinement techniques are improved, the oil could be used in a number of industries, including cosmetics, coatings, plastics, and lubricants. One obstacle to use is the oil's reddish-brown color, which makes it less valuable for certain applications than the colorless or pale yellow castor oil. Breeding may reduce the pigment load of the plant's oils over time. Breeding may also favor other characteristics in this species, such as its capacity for cultivation in other climates, male sterility to allow better control of pollination, and tolerance for a wider array of soil types.

The plant has uses beyond its oil. The seed coat of P. fendleri also contains a useful natural gum which might be viable as a food additive similar to xanthan gum. The mash is high in protein, and has a similar proportion of various amino acids to the soybean. It may prove to be a good animal fodder.

References

External links
USDA Plants Profile for Physaria fendleri (lesquerella)
USDA.gov: Industrial uses of Physaria fendleri
Hort.purdue.edu: New crop fact sheet for Lesquerella
Hort.purdue.edu: Lesquerella oil in cosmetics
Arizona.edu: "Lesquerella, an Arizona specialty crop"

fendleri
Crops originating from Mexico
Crops originating from the United States
Flora of Arizona
Flora of Chihuahua (state)
Flora of Coahuila
Flora of Colorado
Flora of Durango
Flora of New Mexico
Flora of Nuevo León
Flora of San Luis Potosí
Flora of Texas
Flora of Utah
Flora of Zacatecas
Flora of the Great Plains (North America)
Taxa named by Asa Gray
Flora without expected TNC conservation status